Minister General is the term used for the leader or Superior General of the different branches of the Order of Friars Minor. It is a term exclusive to them, and comes directly from its founder, St. Francis of Assisi.  He chose this word over "Superior" out of his vision that the brothers of the Order were all to be equal, and that the friar supervising his brothers was to be a servant who cared for (ministered to) them, not one who lorded over them. The original term is minister generalis in Latin and is found in Chapter 8 of the Rule of St. Francis.

The term is sometimes written as "General Minister", but this is the official form in the English language, in keeping with other official titles.

Francis chose this term to designate the leaders of the various communities scattered around Europe even within his lifetime.

In the 20th century, the term also came to be used as well by many religious congregations of the Third Order of St. Francis, in the effort to follow more closely the spirit of the founder of their Order.

See also

 List of Ministers General of the Order of Friars Minor

References